French America, sometimes called Franco-America, in contrast to Anglo-America, is the French-speaking community of people and their diaspora, notably those tracing back origins to New France, the early French colonization of the Americas. The Canadian province of Quebec is the centre of the community and is the point of origin of most of French America. It also includes communities in all provinces of Canada (especially in New Brunswick, where francophones are roughly one third of the population), Saint Pierre and Miquelon, Saint Martin, Saint Barthélemy, Martinique, Guadeloupe (all are parts of France), Saint Lucia and Haiti in the Caribbean; French Guiana (overseas region of France) in South America. Also there are minorities of French speakers in part of the United States (New England, Louisiana, Mississippi, Florida, Texas, California, Illinois and New York), the Dominican Republic, Dominica, Grenada and Trinidad and Tobago.

The Ordre des francophones d'Amérique is a decoration given in the name of the community to its members. It can also be described as the Francophonie of the Americas.

Because French is a Romance language, French America is sometimes considered to be part of Latin America, but this term more often refers to Hispanic America and Portuguese America, or simply the Americas south of the United States.

Countries, administrative divisions and French possessions
This is a list of countries, administrative divisions and French possessions in the Americas having the French language as an official language or where a French-based creole language is commonly spoken. The data of each place are based in the 2012–2013 Census.

Members and corresponding diasporas
Acadia—(Acadians)
Cajuns

See also

American French
Acadia
Franco-American relations
Francophone
Francophonie
Franco-Ontarian
French Canadians
French Americans
French colonization of the Americas
French language in the United States
French Louisiana
French West Indies
Haiti
French-based creole languages
History of Quebec
New England French
Missouri French
Colonial French
New France
Quebec
Saint Pierre and Miquelon
Cajun
Louisiana
Louisiana Creole
Latin America
French language in Canada
Newfoundland French
French colonial empire

Notes

References

 
Regions of the Americas